The Haas House is a building in Vienna at the Stock-im-Eisen-Platz.

Designed by the Austrian architect Hans Hollein, it is a building in the postmodernist style and was completed in 1990. The building is located at the site of the former Philipp Haas & Söhne (de) flagship department store dating to 1867, destroyed during World War II and rebuilt in 1953. The use of the Haas-Haus is divided between retail and a restaurant. The building is considered controversial owing to its contrast with the adjacent Stephansdom cathedral.

In December 2014, Uniqa Insurance Group sold the building to the Austrian catering company Do & Co, which now uses it as their headquarters.

References

External links

 Description with pictures
 The "Haas House" in Vienna a short video about Hollein's building in the historical city center of Vienna

Buildings and structures in Vienna
Postmodern architecture
Commercial buildings completed in 1990
Buildings and structures in Innere Stadt